Marcel Husson (born 23 January 1937 in Metz) is a retired French football defender and manager.

Playing career

Club
Husson played for Metz, AS Talanges and Amnéville.

Managerial career
He also coached AS Talanges, Amnéville, Metz, Lens, Gueugnon, Nancy, Club Africain, Buraydah, GFCO Ajaccio and WAC Casablanca.

References and notes

External links
 Profile at the official web site of FC Metz

1937 births
Living people
Footballers from Metz
French footballers
FC Metz players
Ligue 1 players
Ligue 2 players
French football managers
FC Metz managers
RC Lens managers
FC Gueugnon managers
AS Nancy Lorraine managers
Gazélec Ajaccio managers
CSO Amnéville players
Club Africain football managers
Wydad AC managers

Association football defenders
Botola managers
French expatriate football managers
French expatriate sportspeople in Morocco
French expatriate sportspeople in Saudi Arabia
French expatriate sportspeople in Tunisia
Expatriate football managers in Morocco
Expatriate football managers in Saudi Arabia
Expatriate football managers in Tunisia